Meshach Dean (probably born March 1870 – 1916) was an English footballer who played for Burslem Port Vale in the 1890s.

Career
Dean joined Burslem Port Vale in 1890; he soon became a regular and helped the team win numerous cups, becoming the top scorer for the 1892–93 Football League season with six competitive goals. He scored one of Vale's four goals in the 4–1 victory over Crewe Alexandra on 24 September 1892 – the first Football League game to be played at the Athletic Ground. He also scored once against Bootle and three times in two games against Northwich Victoria. He was an ever-present during the 1893–94 season, and claimed eight goals in his 28 Second Division appearances. He scored eight league and FA Cup goals in 29 games in the 1894–95 campaign to finish as the club's top-scorer for a second time. However, after three games he lost his first team place in September 1895 and was probably released at the close of the 1895–96 season having played 151 games (75 in the English Football League) and scored 42 goals (21 in the Football League) for the club.

Career statistics
Source:

Honours
Burslem Port Vale
North Staffordshire Charity Challenge Cup: 1891
Staffordshire Charity Cup: 1892

References

1870 births
1916 deaths
Sportspeople from Burslem
English footballers
Association football midfielders
Port Vale F.C. players
Midland Football League players
English Football League players